Anita Herr (born 25 January 1987, in Tatabánya) is a former Hungarian handballer.

Achievements
Nemzeti Bajnokság I:
Winner: 2006, 2009
Magyar Kupa:
Winner: 2006, 2009
EHF Champions League:
Finalist: 2009
EHF Cup Winners' Cup:
Finalist: 2006

Personal
Anita's older sister, Orsolya is a former Hungarian international handball goalkeeper.

References

External links
 Anita Herr career statistics at Worldhandball

1987 births
Living people
People from Tatabánya
Hungarian female handball players
Expatriate handball players
Hungarian expatriate sportspeople in Germany
Győri Audi ETO KC players
Siófok KC players
Fehérvár KC players
Sportspeople from Komárom-Esztergom County